Radioconus goeldi is a species  of small air-breathing land snails, terrestrial pulmonate gastropod mollusks in the family Charopidae. This species is endemic to Brazil.

References 

Goeldi
Molluscs of Brazil
Endemic fauna of Brazil
Gastropods described in 1927
Taxonomy articles created by Polbot